The Kofarnihon (Kafirnigan) is one of the major tributaries of the Amu Darya (together with Vakhsh and Panj) in Tajikistan. It rises on the southern slopes of Gissar Range in Vahdat district, formerly Kofarnihon district, and flows in the general south-western direction past the cities of Vahdat and Dushanbe, where it turns south and runs through Khatlon Province toward the border with Afghanistan. It falls into Amudarya some 40 km west of the confluence point of Vakhsh and Panj rivers. The Kofarnihon is an important source of drinking water, and yet it is highly polluted by irrigation runoff and inadequately cleaned recycled water around the cities of Dushanbe and Vahdat.

For part of its course, it forms the border between Tajikistan and Uzbekistan. Its main tributaries are the Varzob and Khanaka from the right, and the Elok from the right.

References

External links
 Kafirnigan River

Rivers of Tajikistan
Rivers of Uzbekistan